Creekside Mushrooms is a mushroom farm located on Moonlight Drive in Worthington, Pennsylvania.

Description
Creekside Mushrooms consists of 150 miles of "maze-like" tunnels 300 feet underground located in a former limestone mine and is the largest mushroom production facility in the world.

Filming location
A chase sequence in the 2012 superhero film The Avengers was shot at the facility.

References

Armstrong County, Pennsylvania
Food and drink companies based in Pennsylvania